The 36th National Film Awards, presented by Directorate of Film Festivals, the organisation set up by Indian Ministry of Information and Broadcasting, India to felicitate the best of Indian Cinema released in the year 1988. Ceremony took place in 1989.

Awards 

Awards were divided into feature films, non-feature films, and books written on Indian cinema.

Lifetime Achievement Award

Feature films 
Feature films were awarded at All India as well as regional level. For 36th National Film Awards, a Malayalam film, Piravi won the National Film Award for Best Feature Film whereas a Telugu film, Daasi won the maximum number of awards (5). Following were the awards given in each category:

Juries 
A committee headed by Tapan Sinha was appointed to evaluate the feature films awards. Following were the jury members:
 Jury members
 Tapan Sinha (Chairperson)Balu MahendraBharathirajaBhaskar ChandavarkarBimal DuttCharu Kamal HazarikaDhira BiswalJatin DasJ. P. DasJayoo PatwardhanLakshmi DeepakN. Lakshmi NarayanNiranjan RoyC. RadhakrishnanV. Raja KrishnanVasant Chaudhury

All India Award 
Following were the awards given:

Golden Lotus Award 
Official name: Swarna Kamal

All awardees receive the Golden Lotus Award (Swarna Kamal), a certificate and cash prize.

Silver Lotus Award 

Official name: Rajat Kamal

All awardees receive the Silver Lotus Award (Rajat Kamal), a certificate and cash prize.

Regional awards 

The award is given to best film in the regional languages in India.

Best Feature Film in Each of the Language Other Than Those Specified in the Schedule VIII of the Constitution

Non-feature films 

Short films made in any Indian language and certified by the Central Board of Film Certification as a documentary/newsreel/fiction are eligible for non-feature film section.

Juries 

A committee headed by Homi Sethna was appointed to evaluate the non-feature films awards. Following were the jury members:
 Jury Members
 Homi Sethna (Chairperson)JagmohanSamiran DuttaRam MohanRajiv Mehrotra

Golden Lotus Award 

Official name: Swarna Kamal

All the awardees receive the Golden Lotus Award (Swarna Kamal), a certificate and cash prize.

Silver Lotus Award 

Official name: Rajat Kamal

All the awardees receive the Silver Lotus Award (Rajat Kamal) and cash prize.

Best Writing on Cinema 

The awards aim at encouraging study and appreciation of cinema as an art form and dissemination of information and critical appreciation of this art-form through publication of books, articles, reviews etc.

Juries 

A committee headed by Chidananda Dasgupta was appointed to evaluate the writing on Indian cinema. Following were the jury members:
 Jury Members
 Chidananda Dasgupta (Chairperson)M. F. ThomasVinod Tiwari

Silver Lotus Award 
Official name: Rajat Kamal

All the awardees receive the Silver Lotus Award (Rajat Kamal) and cash prize.

Awards not given 

Following were the awards not given as no film was found to be suitable for the award:

 Second Best Feature Film
 Best Film on Family Welfare
 Best Biographical Film
 Best Exploration / Adventure Film
 Best Animation Film
 Best Historical Reconstruction/Compilation Film
 Best Feature Film in Bengali
 Best Feature Film in Manipuri
 Best Feature Film in Marathi
 Best Feature Film in Punjabi
 Best Feature Film in Tamil
 Best Promotional Film

References

External links 
 National Film Awards Archives
 Official Page for Directorate of Film Festivals, India

National Film Awards (India) ceremonies
1989 Indian film awards